Siniša Janković (born January 18, 1978) is a Serbian football forward.

References

External links
 
 Player profile at PrvaLiga 

1978 births
Living people
Serbian footballers
Serbian expatriate footballers
Empoli F.C. players
Cosenza Calcio 1914 players
Expatriate footballers in Italy
AC Bellinzona players
Expatriate footballers in Switzerland
FK Borac Čačak players
NK Primorje players
NK Domžale players
NK Nafta Lendava players
Slovenian PrvaLiga players
Serbian expatriate sportspeople in Slovenia
Expatriate footballers in Slovenia
Association football midfielders